Alessandro Sgrigna (born 24 April 1980 in Rome) is an Italian former football forward who last played for Leodari Vicenza.

Club career
Sgrigna started his career at Rome for Lodigiani. He played for Internazionale youth team before back to Rome.

Vicenza
He then signed by Vicenza in mid of 1999. He also co-owned with Verona from 1999 to 2002. He played 3 league matches before loaned out in 2000–01 season, which he stayed from June to October 2000. . Returned to Vicenza in 2001, he started to play regularly, collected 24 league appearances but in next season just played twice in 2002–03 Serie B until left the club in January 2003.

Cittadella
Sgrigna was loaned to Cittadella of 2002–03 Serie C1 in mid of the season. He was signed in another co-ownership deal along with Stefano Mazzocco at the start of 2003–04 season, played another 57 league matches for Cittadella. In June 2005, Vicenza won the blind auction against Cittadella for the player.

Vicenza (2)
Sgrigna made 33 appearances and 4 goals in 2005–06 Serie B. After he scored nil in 2006–07 season, Sgrigna was loaned to Bari of the same league.

Triestina
In July 2007 he went on loan to Triestina, for €100,000, also from Serie B, coached by Rolando Maran, the same coach at Bari. Triestina bought him in co-ownership deal (exchanged with Emiliano Testini, both tagged for €900,000) in January 2008 but in June Vicenza bought back Sgrigna again, for €500,000 (while Testini was tagged for €480,000).

Vicenza (3)

Torino
In August 2010 he was exchanged with Elvis Abbruscato. Sgrigna was valued €1.32 million and Abbruscato for €1.2 million.

International career
Sgrigna has been capped for the Italian U16, U17, and U18 teams. He played at 1999 UEFA European Under-18 Football Championship that lost to Portugal in the final.

References

External links
 Profile at Italian Footballers' Association (AIC), data by football.it 
 

Italian footballers
Italy youth international footballers
Serie A players
Serie B players
Serie C players
A.S. Lodigiani players
Inter Milan players
L.R. Vicenza players
U.S. Pistoiese 1921 players
A.C. Reggiana 1919 players
A.S. Cittadella players
S.S.C. Bari players
U.S. Triestina Calcio 1918 players
Torino F.C. players
Hellas Verona F.C. players
Association football forwards
Footballers from Rome
1980 births
Living people